Jain ethical code prescribes two dharmas or rules of conduct. One for those who wish to become ascetic and another for the śrāvaka (householders). Five fundamental vows are prescribed for both votaries. These vows are observed by śrāvakas (householders) partially and are termed as anuvratas (small vows). Ascetics observe these fives vows more strictly and therefore observe complete abstinence. These five vows are:
 Ahiṃsā (Non-violence)
 Satya (Truth)
 Asteya (Non-stealing)
 Brahmacharya (Chastity)
 Aparigraha (Non-possession)

According to Jain text, Puruşārthasiddhyupāya:

Apart from five main vows, a householder is expected to observe seven supplementary vows (śeelas) and last sallekhanā vow.

Maha vratas (major vows)

Mahavrata (lit. major vows) are the five fundamental observed by the Jain ascetics. According to Acharya Samantabhadra’s Ratnakaraņdaka śrāvakācāra:

Ahiṃsā 

Ahimsa (non-injury) is formalised into Jain doctrine as the first and foremost vow. According to the Jain text, Tattvarthsutra: "The severance of vitalities out of passion is injury."

Satya 

Satya is the vow to not lie, and to speak the truth. A monk or nun must not speak the false, and either be silent or speak the truth. According to Pravin Shah, the great vow of satya applies to "speech, mind, and deed", and it also means discouraging and disapproving others who perpetuate a falsehood.

The underlying cause of falsehood is passion and therefore, it is said to cause hiṃsā (injury).

Asteya 

Asteya as a great vow means not take anything which is not freely given and without permission. It applies to anything even if unattended or unclaimed, whether it is of worth or worthless thing. This vow of non-stealing applies to action, speech and thought. Further a mendicant, states Shah, must neither encourage others to do so nor approve of such activities.

According to the Jain text, Puruṣārthasiddhyupāya:

According to Tattvarthasutra, five observances that strengthen this vow are:
Residence in a solitary place
Residence in a deserted habitation
Causing no hindrance to others,
Acceptance of clean food, and
Not quarreling with brother monks.

Brahmacharya 

Brahmacharya as a great vow of Jain mendicants means celibacy and avoiding any form of sexual activity with body, words or mind. A monk or nun should not enjoy sensual pleasures, which includes all the five senses, nor ask others to do the same, nor approve of another monk or nun engaging in sexual or sensual activity.

Aparigraha 

According to Tattvarthsutra, "Infatuation is attachment to possessions". Jain texts mentions that "attachment to possessions (parigraha) is of two kinds: attachment to internal possessions (ābhyantara parigraha), and attachment to external possessions (bāhya parigraha).
The fourteen internal possessions are:
Wrong belief
The three sex-passions
Male sex-passion
Female sex-passion
Neuter sex-passion
Six defects
Laughter
Liking
Disliking
Sorrow
Fear
Disgust
Four passions
Anger
Pride
Deceitfulness
Greed

External possessions are divided into two subclasses, the non-living, and the living. According to Jain texts, both internal and external possessions are proved to be hiṃsā (injury).

Anuvratas (Minor vows) 
The five great vows apply only to ascetics in Jainism, and in their place are five minor vows for householders. The historic texts of Jains accept that any activity by a layperson would involve some form of himsa (violence) to some living beings, and therefore the minor vow emphasizes reduction of the impact and active efforts to protect. The five "minor vows" in Jainism are modeled after the great vows, but differ in degree and they are less demanding or restrictive than the same "great vows" for ascetics. Thus, brahmacharya for householders means chastity, or being sexually faithful to one's partner. Similarly, states John Cort, a mendicant's great vow of ahimsa requires that he or she must avoid gross and subtle forms of violence to all six kinds of living beings (earth beings, water beings, fire beings, wind beings, vegetable beings and mobile beings). In contrast, a Jain householder's minor vow requires no gross violence against higher life forms and an effort to protect animals from "slaughter, beating, injury and suffering".

Apart from five fundamental vows seven supplementary vows are prescribed for a śrāvaka. These include three guņa vratas (Merit vows) and four śikşā vratas (Disciplinary vows). The vow of sallekhanâ is observed by the votary at the end of his life. It is prescribed both for the ascetics and householders. According to the Jain text, Puruşārthasiddhyupāya:

The five 'lesser vows' of anuvrata consist of the five greater vows but with less restrictions to incorporate the duties of a householder, i.e. a layperson with a home, he or she has responsibilities to the family, community and society that a Jain monk does not have. These minor vows have the following incorporated into ethical conduct:

 Take account of the responsibilities of a householder.
 Are often limited in time.
 Are often limited in scope.

Guņa vratas 
Digvrata- restriction on movement with regard to directions.
Bhogopabhogaparimana- vow of limiting consumable and non-consumable things
Anartha-dandaviramana- refraining from harmful occupations and activities (purposeless sins).

Śikşā vratas 
Samayika- vow to meditate and concentrate periodically.
Desavrata- limiting movement to certain places for a fixed period of time.
Prosadhopavâsa- Fasting at regular intervals.
Atihti samvibhag- Vow of offering food to the ascetic and needy people.

Sallekhanā 

An ascetic or householder who has observed all the prescribed vows to shed the karmas, takes the vow of sallekhanā at the end of his life. According to the Jain text, Purushartha Siddhyupaya, "sallekhana enable a householder to carry with him his wealth of piety".

Transgressions 

There are five, five transgressions respectively for the vows and the supplementary vows.

See also 
 Jain philosophy
 Five precepts 
 Pratima (Jainism)
 Tapas (Indian religions)
 Tapas (Jain religion)

References

Sources

External links

 
Jain law